Ernest Street (born 1878) was an English footballer. His regular position was as a forward. He was born in Altrincham, Cheshire. He played for Manchester United and Sale Homefield.

External links
MUFCInfo.com profile

1878 births
English footballers
Manchester United F.C. players
Year of death missing
Association football forwards